Muhammad Ali and Zora Folley fought at Madison Square Garden in New York City on March 22, 1967. Ali won the bout by knocking out Folley in the seventh round. This would be Ali's last boxing match before his suspension from boxing.

References

Folley
1967 in boxing
World Boxing Association heavyweight championship matches
World Boxing Council heavyweight championship matches
March 1967 sports events in the United States